Helfaut is a commune in the Pas-de-Calais department in the Hauts-de-France region of France.

Geography
A large village situated 4 miles (6 km) south of Saint-Omer, at the D195 and D198 crossroads.
It is located on a geological formation called the "plateau d'Helfaut", which separates the Aa valley to the north from the Lys valley, to the south. The commune is home to a unique geological heritage, resulting in an unusual landscape. The sides of the old quarries alongside the plateau display many geological strata. The quarries of Heuringhem and Blendecques have collapsed as a result of soil creep. The commune gave its name to 'Dilluvium d’Helfaut', a flint and clay formation rare in France and Europe.
The commune is home to many rare and protected species in a heathland landscape, which is unusual for northern France and justified the creation of a nature reserve (Les Landes d'Helfaut).

Population
The inhabitants are called Helfalois.

History
The village was subject to much damage during World War II, as it was here that the Germans sited La coupole,  an underground bunker, housing a huge concrete dome built by the Nazis between 1943 and 1944. Initially this bunker was to serve as a base to launch V2 rockets, but it never entered service because of the many bombing raids by the Allies. The Dome has been transformed into a museum.

Places of interest
 The church of St. Fuscien and St. Victoric, dating from the thirteenth century.
 The church at Bilques.
 La Coupole : Second World War museum and visitor's centre
 The monument known as the ‘Helfaut column’. See :fr:colonne d'Helfaut

See also
 Communes of the Pas-de-Calais department

References

External links

 Statistical data, INSEE

Communes of Pas-de-Calais